Eight vessels of the British Royal Navy have been named HMS Bermuda, after the island of Bermuda.

  was a 14-gun brig-sloop purchased in 1795 that disappeared in September 1796 in the Gulf of Florida.
  was an 18-gun sloop-of-war launched in 1805 and wrecked 22 April 1808 with no loss of life.
  was a 10-gun brig-sloop built by John Pelham of Frindsbury and launched 1808; she was wrecked 16 November 1816, with the loss of one life.
  was a pilot boat acquired in 1813 and broken up 1817.
  was a schooner purchased 1819 and foundered in March 1821 near Bermuda with the loss of her entire crew.
  was a 3-gun schooner launched 1848 and wrecked 20 January 1855, with no loss of life.
  was a cruiser launched 1941 and broken up 1965.

See also
 History of the Royal Navy in Bermuda

Sources

References
 
 

Royal Navy ship names